The Stockton-Curry House (also known as the Philip A. Stockton House or C.H. Curry House) is a historic house located in Quincy, Florida. It is locally significant as a surviving example of antebellum-era Classic Revival architecture.

Description and history 
It was originally of clap-boarded frame construction, two-and-a-half stories in height, and covered by a moderately pitched roof. It had a rectangular plan with a broad central hall, two rooms deep, and the stairs were partitioned within one of the rear bedrooms. It was added to the National Register of Historic Places on December 31, 1974.

References

External links
 Gadsden County listings at Florida's Office of Cultural and Historical Programs

Houses in Gadsden County, Florida
Houses on the National Register of Historic Places in Florida
National Register of Historic Places in Gadsden County, Florida
1840s establishments in Florida Territory